A liberation movement is an organization or political movement leading a rebellion, or a non-violent social movement, against a colonial power or national government, often seeking independence based on a nationalist identity and an anti-imperialist outlook.

Notable liberation movements 
Gay liberation, a movement that urged lesbians and gay men to engage in direct action, and to be proud of their sexuality.
Goa liberation movement, a movement which fought to end Portuguese colonial rule in Goa, India.
Men's liberation movement,  a social movement critical of the restraints which society imposes on men.
Russian Liberation Movement, a movement within the Soviet Union that sought to create an anti-communist armed force during World War II.
Women's liberation movement, a movement of women who proposed that economic, psychological, and social freedom were necessary for women to be equal.
Animal liberation movement, a movement to stop killing animals for human needs.

See also
Anti-imperialism
Civil disobedience
List of active autonomist and secessionist movements
List of historical autonomist and secessionist movements
Wars of national liberation
List of national liberation movements recognized by intergovernmental organizations

References 

National liberation movements